Sport and Recreation South Africa (also known as the Department of Sport and Recreation) was until 2019 the department of the Government of South Africa responsible for sport in South Africa. In June 2019 it was merged with the Department of Arts and Culture to form a new Department of Sports, Arts and Culture.

References

External links
 Official website

Former government departments of South Africa
Sports ministries
Sport in South Africa